Diego Magno (born 27 April 1989) is a Uruguayan rugby union player who played flanker and 8 for the Houston SaberCats in Major League Rugby (MLR).

He was named in Uruguay's squad for the 2015 and 2019 Rugby World Cup.

Honours
Uruguay U20
World Rugby Under 20 Trophy: 2008

References

External links

1989 births
Living people
Expatriate rugby union players in the United States
Houston SaberCats players
Place of birth missing (living people)
Rugby union flankers
Uruguay international rugby union players
Uruguayan expatriate rugby union players
Uruguayan expatriate sportspeople in the United States
Uruguayan rugby union players
Rugby union number eights
Peñarol Rugby players
American Raptors players